Pontyclun Football Club is an amateur Welsh football club, founded in 1896 which plays its matches at Ivor Park, Pontyclun. It plays in the Ardal Leagues South West, the third tier of the Welsh football pyramid.

In its early years, the club played in the Bridgend League and the Cardiff & District League. In 1922, it was then admitted to the Football Association of Wales, one of the few amateur clubs at the time to achieve such status. Within a few years, the FAW adopted Pontyclun's motto 'Gorau chwarae, cyd chwarae' (roughly translated as 'the best players play together') as its own.

In 1968, the club was admitted to the Welsh Football League (then the premier league in Wales). At the same time, Pontyclun continued to run teams in both the Rhondda and Pontypridd leagues.

Since 1968, the club has played most of its games in the 3rd division, but has three times achieved promotion. In 1979–80 the club was runner up to Lake United and again in 1992–93 to Treowen. In the 2002–03 season the club was crowned champions of Division Three, pipping Skewen Athletic by a goal difference of one on the final day of the season. At the same time, the Reserves were Runners Up in the Reserve East Division.

Four Pontyclun players have achieved high honours – Thomas Edward Russell who was goalkeeper and secretary in the 1920s became President of the FAW from 1968 to 1972. Former Cardiff City centre half Keith Pontin, who was also a Pontyclun youth product and local boy capped by Wales in 1981.

Wayne Morgan, who was a professional with Norwich City was capped by Wales at U17 level.

Craig Williams was capped by the Boys Clubs of Wales in 2002 as well as representing the Swansea City and Cardiff City Youth teams.

Recent developments at the club include a brand new clubhouse and 100 seater stand.

Current Senior Team Squad

Coaching staff
 1st Team Manager: Barry Quinn
 1st Team Coach: Eliot Davey, Huw Jones
 Secretary : Gwion Kennard
 Physio: Martin Lawrence
 Groundsman: Mark Convery

Football clubs in Wales
Association football clubs established in 1896
1896 establishments in Wales
Pontyclun
Welsh Football League clubs
South Wales Alliance League clubs
Ardal Leagues clubs